Robert Stormont Anderson "Stormy" Pfohl (May 21, 1926 – May 11, 1996) was an American football player who played at the back position.

A native of Vincennes, Indiana, he attended Goshen High School and then played college football for the United States Merchant Marine Academy and the Purdue Boilermakers.

He was selected by the New York Giants in the seventh round (46th overall pick) of the 1948 NFL Draft. He opted instead to play in the All-America Football Conference (AAFC) for the Baltimore Colts during the 1948 and 1949 seasons. He appeared in a total of 26 AAFC games, 21 as a starter. In one of his first pro games, he scored three touchdowns, including a 92-yard punt return.

After retiring as a player, he served as head football coach at Marion High School in 1950 and 1951. He also worked for the Bell Fibre Corp for 30 years, retiring in 1980 as vice president of sales. He was inducted into the Indiana Football Hall of Fame in 1986. He died in 1996 at age 69.

References

1926 births
1996 deaths
Baltimore Colts (1947–1950) players
Merchant Marine Mariners football players
Purdue Boilermakers football players
High school football coaches in Indiana
People from Goshen, Indiana
People from Vincennes, Indiana
Coaches of American football from Indiana
Players of American football from Indiana